Havre Air Force Station (site designator P-25, Z-25 after 31 July 1963) is a Formerly Used Defense Site that was used as a Cold War general surveillance radar station.  In addition to radar facilities and a NORAD Control Center the site had support services: NCO club, bowling alley, hobby shops, library, movie theater, barber shop, exchange, commissary, grade school, and housing for officers and senior NCOs.

History
In late 1951 Air Defense Command selected Simpson, Montana as a site for one of twenty-eight radar stations built as part of the second segment of the permanent radar surveillance network. Prompted by the start of the Korean War, on July 11, 1950, the Secretary of the Air Force asked the Secretary of Defense for approval to expedite construction of the second segment of the permanent network. Receiving the Defense Secretary's approval on July 21, the Air Force directed the United States Army Corps of Engineers to proceed with construction.

On 1 March 1951 the 778th Aircraft Control and Warning Squadron was activated at Simpson and began operating AN/FPS-3 and AN/FPS-4 radars.  Initially, the station functioned as a ground control intercept (GCI) and warning station.  As a GCI station, the squadron's role was to guide interceptor aircraft toward unidentified intruders picked up on the unit's radar scopes.

Havre Air Force Station
The site was renamed Havre Air Force Station on 1 December 1953.  The Air Force added an AN/GPS-3 radar c. late 1958 that stayed until 1965.

During 1961 Havre AFS joined the Semi Automatic Ground Environment (SAGE) system, when a Burroughs AN/FST-2 Coordinate Data Transmitting Set was installed to transfer radar track data to Air Defense Direction Center DC-20 at Malmstrom Air Force Base, Montana.  After joining SAGE, the squadron was redesignated as the 778th Radar Squadron (SAGE) on 1 March 1961.  The radar squadron provided information 24/7 the SAGE Direction Center where it was analyzed to determine range, direction altitude speed and whether or not aircraft were friendly or hostile.  On 31 July 1963, the site was redesignated as NORAD ID Z-25.

In the early 1960s AN/FPS-6 and AN/FPS-6B radars took over height-finder duties. The AN/FPS-6B was upgraded to an AN/FPS-90 in 1964; it was deactivated in 1969. In 1965 an AN/FPS-27 replaced the AN/GPS-3 as the search radar.

In addition to the main facility, Havre operated two AN/FPS-18 Gap Filler sites:
 Galata, Montana     (P-25A) 
 Hogeland, Montana  (P-25B)

Backup Interceptor Control
Over the years, the equipment at the station was upgraded or modified to improve the efficiency and accuracy of the information gathered by the radars.  The 778th Radar Sq was inactivated and replaced by the 778th Air Defense Group in March 1970.   The upgrade to group status was done because of Havre AFS' status as a Backup Interceptor Control (BUIC) site. BUIC sites were alternate control sites in the event that SAGE Direction Centers became disabled and unable to control interceptor aircraft. The group was inactivated and replaced by the 778th Radar Squadron. as defenses against manned bombers were reduced. Havre AFS was assigned to Malmstrom Air Force Base on 17 June 1974.

Prior to the December 1979 breakup of Aerospace Defense Command, during the Department of Defense announced the proposed closure of "40 obsolete air defense radar stations", 95 military and 25 civilian positions were lost and Havre AFS closed on 1 July 1979. The 778th Radar Squadron did not inactivate until September.

Anchor Academy
The Anchor Academy, a school for troubled teenage boys, operated at the station in 2001, and a few homes in the former military housing area are private residences.

Air Force units and assignments

Units
Squadron
 Constituted as the 778th Aircraft Control and Warning Squadron
 Activated 1 March 1951 at Simpson, Montana
 Redesignated 778th Radar Squadron (SAGE) on 1 March 1961
 Inactivated on 1 March 1970
 Redesignated 778th Radar Squadron on 1 January 1974
 Activated on 17 January 1974
 Inactivated on 29 September 1979

Group
 Constituted as the 778th Air Defense Group on 13 February 1970
 Activated on 1 March 1970
 Inactivated on 17 January 1974
 Disbanded on 21 September 1984

Assignments
 545th Aircraft Control and Warning Group, 1 March 1951
 29th Air Division, 6 February 1952
 Great Falls Air Defense Sector, 1 July 1960
 28th Air Division, 1 April 1966
 24th Air Division, 19 November 1969 – 29 September 1979

Commanders
 778th Radar Squadron
 Maj. Lowell D. Covington, unknown – 1 Mar 1970
 778th Air Defense Group
 Maj. Lowell D. Covington, 1 Mar 1970 – unknown

See also
 List of United States Air Force aircraft control and warning squadrons
 United States general surveillance radar stations

References

Notes

Bibliography

 
 
 

Further reading
 , 
 
 
 Information for Havre AFS, MT

Installations of the United States Air Force in Montana
Semi-Automatic Ground Environment sites
Aerospace Defense Command military installations
Buildings and structures in Hill County, Montana
1951 establishments in Montana
1979 disestablishments in Montana
Formerly Used Defense Sites in Montana
Permanent System radar stations
Military installations established in 1951
Military installations closed in 1979